Baitus Samee Mosque or Baitus Sami Mosque may refer to:

Baitus Sami Mosque, Hanover, in Germany
Baitus Samee Mosque, Houston, in Texas, United States